Don Cornell (born Luigi Francisco Varlaro; April 21, 1919 – February 23, 2004) was an American singer.

Early years
Born to an Italian family in The Bronx, New York, Cornell attended Roosevelt High School in the Bronx.

Career
In his teens he played guitar in a band led by jazz trumpeter Red Nichols. When he was eighteen, he was a vocalist in the Sammy Kaye band. He became a solo act in 1949. Between 1950 and 1962, twelve of his records were certified gold. These included "It Isn't Fair" "I'll Walk Alone", "I'm Yours", and "Hold My Hand". He appeared often on television programs hosted by Perry Como, Jackie Gleason, and Arthur Godfrey during the 1950s and 1960s.

When singing at the Beverly Hills Supper Club in Kentucky, he appeared many times on the Ruth Lyons television program and was a substitute host. In 1953, he was on the TV program Chance of a Lifetime. He had a radio program on KGO in San Francisco in 1953.

In 1959, Cornell, comedian Martha Raye, and other investors formed The Big Daddy Mining Company. The company planned to mine "a rich gold vein on a hillside near Coarsegold, California".

Cornell worked as a singer into the 1990s. He and his wife founded the label Iris as a division of MCA to release songs he recorded for Coral and Dot earlier in his career. These albums include Something to Remember Me By and From Italy with Love.

Awards and honors
Cornell was named to the Hollywood Walk of Fame in 1963. In 1993, he was inducted into the Big Band Hall of Fame.

His 1952 hit "I" was the only single-character pop chart entry until Prince's No. 7 Billboard Hot 100 hit "7" from 1992 and the only single-letter hit until Xzibit's No. 76 Hot 100 hit "X" from 2000. "Hold My Hand" sold over one million copies and topped the UK Singles Chart in 1954. Cornell's 1955 hit "Young Abe Lincoln" holds the record for highest debuting pop single (#25) to spend only one week on the Billboard chart.

Death
Cornell died in Aventura, Florida, from emphysema and diabetes at the age of 84.

Hit records

References

External links
 
 Don Cornell recordings at the Discography of American Historical Recordings.

1919 births
2004 deaths
Jazz musicians from New York (state)
Singers from New York City
People from Aventura, Florida
20th-century American singers
American jazz musicians
American people of Italian descent
American male pop singers
Big band singers
Traditional pop music singers
Deaths from diabetes
Deaths from emphysema
Jubilee Records artists
RCA Victor artists
20th-century American male singers
American male jazz musicians